There has been much debate over the Christian views on suicide, with early Christians believing that suicide is sinful and an act of blasphemy. Modern Christians do not consider suicide an unforgivable sin (though still wrong and sinful) or something that prevents a believer who died by suicide from achieving eternal life.

The rate of suicide among Catholics is consistently lower than among Protestants, with Jewish suicide usually lower than both, except during times of persecution against Jews, for instance, during World War II. But religion is not the only factor in per capita suicide: Among Catholics in Italy, the suicide rate is twice as high in Northern Italy than in the southern parts. Hungary and Austria have majority Catholic populations but they are number 2 and number 5 in the list of countries that have the highest suicide rate. And in Ireland, the Catholic and Protestant populations have the same low rate of suicide. French sociologist Émile Durkheim wrote that the higher rate of Protestant suicide is likely due to the greater degree of "the spirit of free inquiry" in the various Protestant sects, whereas the Catholic church supplies its worshippers with a relatively unchanging system of faith, delivered by a hierarchy of authority.

Early Christianity
Suicide was common before Christianity, in the form of personal suicide, to avoid shame or suffering, and also in the form of institutional suicide, such as the intentional deaths of a king's servants, the forced deaths of convicted criminals, the willing suicides of widows, and euthanasia for the elderly and infirm. 
The Donatists, an early Christian sect, contained a fanatical group named the Circumcellions who would attack strangers on the street and attain supposed martyrdom.
Early Christianity established a ban on suicide, greatly reducing its occurrence.

In the fifth century, Augustine wrote The City of God, in it making Christianity's first overall condemnation of suicide. His biblical justification for this was the interpretation of the commandment, "Thou shalt not kill", as he sees the omission of "thy neighbor", which is included in "Thou shalt not bear false witness against thy neighbor", to mean that the killing of oneself is not allowed either. The rest of his reasons were from Plato's Phaedo.

In the sixth century AD, suicide became a secular crime and began to be viewed as sinful. In 1533, those who died by suicide while accused of a crime were denied a Christian burial. In 1562, all suicides were punished in this way. In 1693, even attempted suicide became an ecclesiastical crime, which could be punished by excommunication, with civil consequences following. In the 13th century, Thomas Aquinas denounced suicide as an act against God and as a sin for which one could not repent. Civil and criminal laws were enacted to discourage suicide, and as well as degrading the body rather than permitting a normal burial, the property and possessions of both the person who died by suicide and of their family were confiscated.

Protestant views 
—"If I ascend to heaven, you are there; if I make my bed in Sheol, you are there."—has often been discussed in the context of the fate of those who die by suicide.

Modern Catholicism

According to the theology of the Catholic Church, death by suicide is a grave matter. The Church holds that one's life is the property of God, and to destroy that life is to wrongly assert dominion over God's creation, or to attack God remotely. In the past, the Catholic Church would not conduct funeral services for persons who killed themselves, and they could not be buried in a Catholic cemetery. However, the church lifted the prohibition on funerals for suicide victims in the 1980s.

In the 1990s, Pope John Paul II approved the Catechism of the Catholic Church, which acknowledged the role that mental illnesses may play in suicide. Regarding the effect of psychological disorders on a person's culpability, the Catechism states that:

Despite the fact that historical Catholic doctrine (possibly influenced by the Baltimore Catechism which was used until the 1960s) generally considered suicide to be an actual mortal sin, the Catholic Church rejected this conclusion with the introduction of the Catechism of the Catholic Church, which declared that:

The Catholic Church defines suicide very narrowly to avoid the extrapolation that Jesus's death was a type of suicide, brought about by his own choices, and to avoid the idea that Catholic martyrs choosing death is a valid form of suicide. Instead, Catholics give praise that Jesus resisted suicide throughout his trials, demonstrating that no degradation is so great that suicide can be justified. Martyrs are honored for the same reason.

Mormon views

In the largest denomination of Mormonism the Church of Jesus Christ of Latter-day Saints (LDS Church), teachings on suicide have spanned over a century, with leaders teaching that suicide is against the will of God, though, Church teachings on suicide have changed through the years. The LDS Church opposes physician-assisted suicide and euthanasia.

See also
 Jewish views on suicide
 Religious views on suicide
 Samaritans (charity)

References

Suicide
Religion and suicide
Suicide